was a Japanese football player. He played for the Japan national team.

National team career
In May 1934, when Kanazawa was a Kyoto Imperial University student, he was selected by the Japan national team for the 1934 Far Eastern Championship Games in Manila. At that competition, he debuted on May 13 against the Dutch East Indies. On May 15, he played against the Philippines. He played two games for Japan in 1934.

National team statistics

References

External links
 
 Japan National Football Team Database

Year of birth missing
Year of death missing
Kyoto University alumni
Japanese footballers
Japan international footballers
Association football goalkeepers